Motivation is the first studio album of Moti Special, released in 1985 by Teldec label. The band members were: Danish guitarist Nils Tuxen, Romanian keyboardist Michael Cretu, bassist and vocalist Manfred "Thissy" Thiers, and drummer Reinhard "Dickie" Tarrach. The album reached # 20 in the Germany charts.

Track listing

Personnel 

Moti Special

 Manfred Thiers – vocals, bass guitar
 Michael Cretu – keyboards
 Nils Tuxen – guitar
 Dicky Tarrach – drums, percussion

Production

 Armand Volker – producer, engineer, mixing
 Michael Cretu – producer
 Moti Special – producers

Artwork

 Mike Schmidt – design
 Dieter Stork – photography

Charts

References

External links 

 

1985 debut albums
Moti Special albums
Teldec albums
Albums produced by Michael Cretu